The Tour du Loir-et-Cher is a cycling stage race that takes place in the Loir-et-Cher region of France. The race traditionally starts and finishes in the capital of Blois.  Since at least 2009, the final stage has consisted of a 12-lap circuit race totaling 97.5 km. It is rated as a 2.2 race as part of the UCI Europe Tour. The race first took place in 1960.

Past winners

References

External links 
 

UCI Europe Tour races
Cycle races in France
Recurring sporting events established in 1960